Air is a visual novel developed by Key and published by VisualArt's in 2000. The story follows Yukito Kunisaki, a traveler who arrives in a quiet seaside town during summer who is on a search for the "girl in the sky" that his now-deceased mother told him about and was searching for too. In town, Yukito meets three strange girls and Yukito begins to suspect that one of them may in fact be the girl he has been searching for. It was adapted by Toei Animation into an animated film in 2005 directed by Osamu Dezaki with music direction by Yoshikazu Suo. Kyoto Animation also adapted it into a 13-episode anime television series broadcast in 2005, along with an additional two episodes also broadcast in 2005, directed by Tatsuya Ishihara with music direction by Shinji Orito. The discography of Air and its anime adaptations consists of one EP, one single, two soundtracks, and three remix albums.

The core of the discography is the two original soundtrack albums. The visual novel's soundtrack, which was also used for the anime series, was produced by Key Sounds Label and released in 2002. The music on the soundtrack was composed and arranged by Jun Maeda, Shinji Orito and Magome Togoshi. A soundtrack for the animated film was released in 2005 by Frontier Works. The music on the film soundtrack was mainly composed and arranged by Yoshikazu Suo. Three remix albums were released for the visual novel in 2000, 2003 and 2020, and a remix album was released for the film in 2005. A single for the visual novel was released in 2001 containing a vocal version of a background music track from the game. An EP for the visual novel was released in 2006 covering the three pieces of theme music used in the game as well as two remix versions of the opening and ending themes.

Albums

Ornithopter
Ornithopter is an arrange album released by Key for the Air visual novel, and was packaged with the first edition of the Air visual novel released on September 8, 2000 bearing the catalog number KYCD-0303. Seven of the ten tracks on the album are arrange versions of background music featured in the visual novel, with the last three being the original versions of the game's three main theme songs "Tori no Uta", "Farewell song", and "Aozora". The seven tracks were arranged by several people including Shinji Orito, Magome Togoshi, OdiakeS, and Kazuya Takase of I've Sound. The title of the album comes from ornithopter, an aircraft that flies by flapping its wings.

Air Original Soundtrack
The Air Original Soundtrack, from the visual novel Air, was first released on September 27, 2002 in Japan by Key Sounds Label bearing the catalog numbers KSLA-0004—0005. The soundtrack contains two discs totaling thirty-seven songs composed, arranged, and produced by Jun Maeda, Shinji Orito, Magome Togoshi, and Kazuya Takase of I've Sound. Lia provides vocals for three songs, "Tori no Uta", "Farewell song", and "Aozora".

Re-feel
Re-feel is a piano arrange album with songs taken from the Kanon and Air visual novels and arranged into piano versions. It was first released on December 28, 2003 at Comiket 65 in Japan by Key Sounds Label bearing the catalog number KSLA-0010. The album contains one disc with ten tracks; the first five songs are from Kanon while the last five are from Air. With the exception of track two which is arranged by Riya of Eufonius, all the tracks are arranged by Ryō Mizutsuki, who is credited as Kiyo on the album.

Air Analog Collector's Edition
 is an EP released on a gramophone record for the Air visual novel, which went on sale on May 3, 2006 in Japan by Key Sounds Label bearing the catalog number KSLA-0022. The EP features the three theme songs from the visual novel in regular versions on the A-side, and remix versions of "Tori no Uta" and "Farewell song" on the B-side. The B-side tracks were later featured on the OTSU Club Music Compilation Vol.1 album by Key Sounds Label. All songs on the EP are performed by Lia.

Air Film Soundtrack
The Air Film Soundtrack is the soundtrack for the Air film released by Frontier Works on March 25, 2005 bearing the catalog number FCCM-0066. The album spans one disc with twenty-three tracks featuring music composed by Yoshikazu Suo. The last song on the soundtrack, "If Dreams Came True", is sung by Eri Kawai, and takes its tune from the background music track , originally composed by Shinji Orito, featured in the Air visual novel.

Shinwa e no Izanai
 is an album for the Air film released by Frontier Works on August 5, 2005 bearing the catalog number AIR-0005, and was only released bundled with the special edition Air film DVD. The album contains one disc with a four-movement symphony sampling from four of the themes featured on the Air Film Soundtrack. The pieces were originally composed by Yoshikazu Suo, Shinji Orito, and Kei Haneoka, and were arranged by Yuji Nomi. The symphony was played by the Czech Philharmonic and conducted by Mario Klemens.

Summer Chronicle
Summer Chronicle is a remix album with music tracks taken from the Air, Kud Wafter and Summer Pockets visual novels and arranged into violin and piano versions by Hironori Anazawa. The album is otherwise composed by Jun Maeda, Shinji Orito, Magome Togoshi, Jun'ichi Shimizu and Donmaru. It was released on August 22, 2020 in Japan by Key Sounds Label bearing the catalog number KSLA-0170. The album contains one disc with ten tracks; tracks 1–4 are from Air, tracks 5 and 6 are from Kud Wafter, and tracks 7–10 are from Summer Pockets.

Natsukage / Nostalgia
"Natsukage / Nostalgia" is a single containing songs sung by I've Sound's Lia first released on August 10, 2001 at Comiket 60 in Japan by Key Sounds Label bearing the catalog number KSLA-0002. The single contains the A-side track  which was originally composed as a background music track for the Air visual novel. Depicted on the cover is Nagisa Furukawa from Key's later game Clannad.

Charts

References

Soundtracks
Anime soundtracks
Film soundtracks
Discographies of Japanese artists
Key Sounds Label
Lists of albums
Video game soundtracks